Max Amann (January 19, 1905 – December 24, 1945) was a German water polo player who competed in the 1928 Summer Olympics.He was part of the German team which won the gold medal. He played all three matches and scored three goals.

He was missing in action during World War II, and declared dead in December 1945.

See also
 Germany men's Olympic water polo team records and statistics
 List of Olympic champions in men's water polo
 List of Olympic medalists in water polo (men)

References

External links
 

1905 births
1945 deaths
German male water polo players
Water polo players at the 1928 Summer Olympics
Olympic water polo players of Germany
Olympic gold medalists for Germany
Olympic medalists in water polo
Medalists at the 1928 Summer Olympics
German military personnel killed in World War II
Missing in action of World War II
People declared dead in absentia